Florence Fang (born 1933/1934) is a Chinese-American businesswoman, publisher, and philanthropist active in the San Francisco area. She is the former owner of the San Francisco Examiner and other media titles and has been a fund-raiser for the Republican Party. She is the owner of The Flintstone House in Hillsborough, California, themed on The Flintstones cartoon series.

Early life
Fang was born Li Bangqin in Beijing, and moved to Taiwan in 1949 with some of her family. Fang lived in Taiwan until 1960, when she met and married John Ta Chuan Fang and they migrated to San Francisco.

Business career
Fang and her husband bought Chinese language media titles, before expanding into English-language titles including AsianWeek and the San Francisco Independent.

By 2000, she had sold the "opulent" Grand Palace Restaurant in San Francisco's Chinatown. In 2000, when the Hearst Corporation was facing antitrust concerns (including from Fang) over its acquisition of the San Francisco Chronicle, she acquired the San Francisco Examiner from them for $100 while also receiving a $66 million subsidy from Hearst to run the Examiner for three years, becoming the first Asian American to own a major daily newspaper in the US. In 2004, she sold it to Philip Anschutz for $11 million.

In 2008, Forbes reported that the Internal Revenue Service claimed that the Fang family had understated taxable income by $31 million in the years up to 2002. Florence, her two sons and her dead son's estate launched four counter-claims.

Philanthropy and political activities

Involvement in US politics 
During Fang's ownership, the Grand Palace restaurant had been the "scene of many political gatherings", and the Fangs were "important fund-raisers" for the Republican Party, meeting President George H. W. Bush several times. Bush appointed Fang to the Small Business Administration. In 2019, the San Francisco Chronicle described Fang as having close ties to Democrat politicians as well, including Nancy Pelosi and Dianne Feinstein, and as having been "a key player in the elections of former San Francisco Mayors Frank Jordan and Willie Brown." On the other hand, in 2000 it characterized Chinatown community activist Rose Pak, "who, until the Fangs gained ascendance with Jordan's election, had the ear of City Hall exclusively" as Florence Fang's "archenemy."

Higher education 
In 2013, Florence Fang donated $1 million to launch the "100,000 Strong Foundation" with the aim of promoting Mandarin language education in the US and sending 100,000 US students to study in China within four years. From 2008 to 2013, she donated $2.5 million to finance a building of the School of Chinese as Second Language on the campus of Peking University, which was named the Florence Lee Fang Building. In 2006, UC Berkeley's East Asian Library received $3 million from Fang.

PR China and Taiwan 
Florence Fang is the founder and (as of 2016) honorary president of the Northern California Association for the Promotion of the Peaceful Reunification of China (also known as Chinese for Peaceful Unification-Northern California or Northern California Peaceful Reunification Society), an overseas chapter of the China Council for the Promotion of Peaceful National Reunification, which is a subsidiary organization of the Chinese Communist Party (CCP) that promotes the goal of the PR China gaining control over Taiwan. Chinese media have reported Fang as saying that it was her aim to "prevent the spread of 'Taiwan independence' ideology"; and she called Taiwan a "fake democracy" at appearances with CCP officials.

Florence Fang Asian Community Garden 
The Florence Fang Asian Community Garden (FFACG) opened in 2014 in San Francisco's Bayview-Hunters Point neighborhood, on land owned by Caltrain. U.S. House Minority Leader Nancy Pelosi led the ground breaking ceremonies. FFACG sits on the land of the former DeMattei farm, San Francisco's last commercial farm, which had been operating as late as 1988.

WWII Pacific War Memorial Hall 
Florence Fang initiated the WWII Pacific War Memorial Hall, a two-story museum in San Francisco's Chinatown inaugurated in 2015 on the 70th anniversary of the surrender of Japan that marked the end of World War II. The historian Denise Y. Ho described it as an example of how museums "play an important role in 'telling China's story well' for global audiences," and as "look[ing] remarkably like a Chinese museum, featuring a sculpture 'Great Wall of Blood and Flesh' that evokes the Chinese national anthem." After closing for 16 months due to the COVID-19 pandemic, the museum reopened in 2021 with a new exhibition focusing on the collaboration of the US and China against Japan during World War II, which Fang called "our [countries'] lasting memory" in a speech at the reopening ceremony.

The Flintstone House
Since 2017, Fang has owned The Flintstone House in Hillsborough, a wealthy town south of San Francisco, having previously lived elsewhere in Hillsborough. The house was built in 1976, and designed by the architect William Nicholson. It was listed at US$4.2 million in 2015, but it is believed that Fang bought it for much less.

She added large metal dinosaurs, Flintstones figurines, and letters on the grass that spell out "Yabba-dabba-doo", saying "I see any dinosaur, I buy it." In 2019, the city of Hillsborough sued Fang for causing a public nuisance, and because her changes were largely without permits. Fang engaged lawyers and made counter-claims for violating her First Amendment rights, discrimination and emotional distress. The city's lawsuit was settled in 2021 with Fang receiving $125,000 to cover her expenses from the suit and the right to retain all modifications made, while agreeing to drop her countersuit about racial discrimination.

Personal life
In 1960, she married John Ta Chuan Fang. They had three sons. Their eldest son James was a BART board member for 24 years until 2015, at which point he was described as "the last Republican holding office in San Francisco." As of 2000, their second son Ted was publisher of the San Francisco Independent, and their youngest son, Douglas, earned a doctorate in computer science.  James Fang died in 2020 due to natural causes. Douglas Fang died from stomach cancer in 2003. John Ta Chuan Fang died in 1992.

References

External links 

 Website of the Florence Fang Family Foundation (Information about Fang's various activities, largely in Chinese)

1930s births
Living people
20th-century American newspaper publishers (people)
21st-century American newspaper publishers (people)
American women in business
Businesspeople from Beijing
Businesspeople from San Francisco
California Republicans
People from Hillsborough, California
Taiwanese emigrants to the United States
Taiwanese people from Beijing
20th-century American women
21st-century American women